Saimon Happygod Msuva (born 2 October 1993) is a Tanzanian professional football player who plays for Saudi Arabian club Al-Qadsiah and the Tanzania national team.

Career statistics

Club

Notes

International

International goals
Scores and results list Tanzania's goal tally first.

References

1993 births
Living people
Tanzanian footballers
Tanzanian expatriate footballers
Tanzania international footballers
People from Dar es Salaam
Association football forwards
Tanzanian Premier League players
Botola players
Saudi First Division League players
Azam F.C. players
Moro United F.C. players
Young Africans S.C. players
Difaâ Hassani El Jadidi players
Wydad AC players
Al-Qadsiah FC players
Expatriate footballers in Morocco
Expatriate footballers in Saudi Arabia
Tanzanian expatriate sportspeople in Morocco
2019 Africa Cup of Nations players